Diaobingshan is a city in the northeast of Liaoning province in Northeast China. In 2017 the population was 239,405.

The city was established as Tiefa City, a compound name of nearby Tieling City and Faku County, in 1982 as a coal production base. In 2002 it was renamed to Diaobingshan, which is the name of a mountain west of the city. Diaobingshan, which can be translated as 'troops dispatching mountain' is named for troop movements during the Jin dynasty being dispatched from here.

Administrative divisions
There are seven towns under the city's administration.

Towns:
Bingshan
Daming
Gushanzi
Tiefa
Xiaoming
Xiaonan
Xiaoqing

References

External links

County-level divisions of Liaoning
Tieling